Nicolaes (Klaes) Molenaer (1626-1629 in Haarlem – 1676 in Haarlem) was a Dutch Golden Age landscape painter and draughtsman.

Biography
Molenaer was born and died in Haarlem in the family of tailor Jan Mienssen Molenaer and his second wife Grietgen Adriaens: they would get 8 children of whom no birthdates are known, as the family was Roman Catholic and no baptismal register was kept.

According to the RKD among his brothers there were the painters Bartholomeus and Jan Miense Molenaer. He became a member of the Haarlem Guild of St. Luke in 1651 and paid dues yearly until 1676. He was a winter landscape painter influenced by Jacob van Ruisdael.

References

Nicolaes Molenaer on Artnet
Hans Vollmer (Edit.): General Dictionary of Artists from Antiquity to the Present, Band 25: Moehring–Olivié. E. A. Seemann, Leipzig 1931, p. 32 (as: Molenaer, Klaes (Nicolaes))

1630 births
1676 deaths
Dutch Golden Age painters
Dutch male painters
Artists from Haarlem
Painters from Haarlem